Wolany may refer to the following places in Poland:
Wolany, Lower Silesian Voivodeship (south-west Poland)
Wolany, Masovian Voivodeship (east-central Poland)